Norwegian Township is a township in Schuylkill County, Pennsylvania, United States. The population was 2,167 at the 2020 census.

Geography
According to the United States Census Bureau, the township has a total area of 5.9 square miles (15.4 km), of which 5.8 square miles (15.1 km)  is land and 0.1 square mile (0.2 km)  (1.52%) is water.

Demographics

At the 2000 census there were 2,172 people, 861 households, and 632 families living in the township.  The population density was 371.9 people per square mile (143.6/km).  There were 894 housing units at an average density of 153.1/sq mi (59.1/km).  The racial makeup of the township was 98.94% White, 0.18% African American, 0.28% Native American, 0.32% Asian, 0.14% from other races, and 0.14% from two or more races. Hispanic or Latino of any race were 0.32%.

Of the 861 households 30.5% had children under the age of 18 living with them, 61.9% were married couples living together, 7.4% had a female householder with no husband present, and 26.5% were non-families. 23.6% of households were one person and 13.6% were one person aged 65 or older.  The average household size was 2.52 and the average family size was 2.99.

The age distribution was 22.4% under the age of 18, 5.1% from 18 to 24, 26.3% from 25 to 44, 29.9% from 45 to 64, and 16.3% 65 or older.  The median age was 43 years. For every 100 females, there were 97.3 males.  For every 100 females age 18 and over, there were 90.9 males.

The median household income was $42,540 and the median family income  was $48,603. Males had a median income of $36,131 versus $25,194 for females. The per capita income for the township was $18,699.  About 0.8% of families and 3.3% of the population were below the poverty line, including 1.9% of those under age 18 and 6.5% of those age 65 or over.

Gallery

References

Townships in Schuylkill County, Pennsylvania
Townships in Pennsylvania
Ukrainian communities in the United States